Yejin Choi (born 1977) is the Brett Helsel Professor of Computer Science at the University of Washington. Her research considers natural language processing and computer vision. Choi was awarded a MacArthur Fellowship in 2022.

Early life and education 
Choi is from South Korea. She attended Seoul National University. After earning a bachelor's degree in Computer Science, Choi moved to the United States, where she joined Cornell University as a graduate student. There she worked with Claire Cardie on natural language processing. After earning her doctorate, Choi joined Stony Brook University as an Assistant Professor of Computer Science. At Stony Brook University Choi developed a statistical technique to identify fake hotel reviews.

Research and career 
In 2018 Choi joined the Allen Institute for AI. Her research looks to endow computers with a statistical understanding of written language. She became interested in neural networks and their application in artificial intelligence. She started to assemble a knowledge base that became known as the atlas of machine commonsense (ATOMIC). By the time she had finished the creation of ATOMIC, the language model generative Pre-trained Transformer 2 (GPT-2) had been released. ATOMIC does not make use of linguistic rules, but combines the representations of different languages within a neural network.

In 2020 Choi was endowed with the Brett Helsel Professorship. She has since made use of Commonsense Transformers (COMET) with Good old fashioned artificial intelligence (GOFAI). The approach combines symbolic reasoning and neural networks. She has developed computational models that can detect biases in language that work against people from underrepresented groups. For example, one study demonstrated that female film characters are portrayed as less powerful than their male counterparts.

Awards and honours 

 2013 International Conference on Computer Vision Marr Prize
 2016 Institute of Electrical and Electronics Engineers AI One to Watch
 2017 Facebook ParlAI Research Award
 2018 Anita Borg Early Career Award
 2020 Association for the Advancement of Artificial Intelligence Outstanding Paper Award
 2022 MacArthur Fellowship

Select publications

References 

Living people
MacArthur Fellows
Women computer scientists
South Korean computer scientists
21st-century South Korean women scientists
Seoul National University alumni
Cornell University alumni
Stony Brook University faculty
University of Washington faculty
Natural language processing researchers
Artificial intelligence researchers
21st-century South Korean scientists
1977 births